The Almondell Viaduct, also known as the Camps Viaduct, is a viaduct spanning the gorge of the River Almond in Scotland, located in East Calder, West Lothian, as well as the main canal feeder taking water from the Almond to the Union Canal at Lin's Mill near Ratho

The viaduct is built on nine high segmental brick arches atop rock-faced snecked rubble piers, and features rounded cut-waters in the river below.

History
This famous local landmark was built circa 1865-66 by J. & A. GRANGER, Esqs, Railway Contractors.  It opened to rail traffic in 1867, and remained in operation until 1959 as a single track Mineral Railway bridge on the Camps Branch of the North British Railway. Its purpose was to supply the now-closed Coltness Iron Works with limestone from the Raw Camps and East Camps Quarries in East Calder, where extensive quarries, brickworks and limekilns were once located.
It also supplied James "Paraffin" Young's  Paraffin Light & Mineral Oil Company at Pumpherston with Oil Shale for processing into Paraffin.

On the 13th February 1880, the viaduct was the site of a significant railway accident, when an axle broke on one of the rear wagons, derailing two wagons and the guard's van were off the bridge and into the River below, and tragically killing two guards and a telegraph boy. 

Due to the resulting damage to the structure, the viaduct underwent significant repairs and was possibly even rebuilt.  Many secondary sources for this reason appear to report the build year as 1885, whereas this was most likely the year it was reopened.

The viaduct closed permanently to railway traffic in 1959, and all the rail tracks as well as adjoining Goods Sheds were subsequently removed.

The structure was Category B listed in 1971.

It now lies within the Almondell and Calderwood Country Park, providing a convenient and scenic footpath and cycle path over the Almond gorge, while connecting the villages of East Calder, Pumpherston and Uphall Station.

See also
 List of listed buildings in Kirknewton, West Lothian 
 List of railway bridges and viaducts in the United Kingdom

References

External links

 https://www.scottishshale.co.uk, Postcard - "Almondell Viaduct, East-Calder" (dated 1917). [Museum of the Scottish Shale Oil Industry, Photographed by Robert Braid]

Category B listed buildings in West Lothian
Listed bridges in Scotland
Viaducts in Scotland
1869 establishments in Scotland
Bridges completed in 1869